Friendly Neighbors is a 1940 American comedy film directed by Nick Grinde and written by Dorrell McGowan and Stuart E. McGowan. The film stars the vaudeville comedy troupe the Weaver Brothers and Elviry, with Lois Ranson, Spencer Charters and Cliff Edwards. The film was released on November 17, 1940, by Republic Pictures.

Plot

Cast 
Leon Weaver as Abner Weaver
Frank Weaver as Cicero Weaver
June Weaver as Elviry Weaver
Lois Ranson as Nancy Williams
Spencer Charters as Bumblebee Hibbs
Cliff Edwards as Notes
John Hartley as Breeze Kid
Loretta Weaver as Violey Weaver
Al Shean as Doc
Thurston Hall as The Governor
Margaret Seddon as Martha Williams
Clarence Wilson as Silas Barton
J. Farrell MacDonald as Sheriff Potts
Al St. John as Smokey

References

External links
 

1940 films
1940s English-language films
American comedy films
1940 comedy films
Republic Pictures films
Films directed by Nick Grinde
American black-and-white films
1940s American films